Pope John may refer to:

Pope John I (523–526)
Pope John II (533–535)
Pope John III (561–574)
Pope John IV (640–642)
Pope John V (685–686)
Pope John VI (701–705)
Pope John VII (705–707)
Antipope John VIII (844)
Pope John VIII (872–882)
Pope John IX (898–900)
Pope John X (914–928)
Pope John XI (931–935)
Pope John XII (955–964)
Pope John XIII (965–972)
Pope John XIV (983–984)
Pope John XV (985–996)
Antipope John XVI (997–998)
Pope John XVII (1003)
Pope John XVIII (1003–1009)
Pope John XIX (1024–1032)
Pope John XX (the number XX was skipped)
Pope John XXI (1276–1277)
Pope John XXII (1316–1334)
Antipope John XXIII (1410–1415)
Pope John XXIII (1958–1963)
Another 19 Popes John in the List of Coptic Orthodox Popes of Alexandria

See also 
John Pope (disambiguation)
Pope John (numbering), more details
List of popes
Pope John Paul (disambiguation), named after John XXIII and Paul VI, the only papal double name
Pope Joan, according to legend, a female pope who reigned as John VIII
Pope John of Alexandria (disambiguation)

John